The Warrington Transporter Bridge (or Bank Quay Transporter Bridge) is a structural steel transporter bridge across the River Mersey in Warrington, Cheshire, England.

Design

History
It was constructed in 1915 and fell into disuse in approximately 1964. The bridge was constructed to connect the two parts of the large chemical and soap works of Joseph Crosfield and Sons.

It was the second of two transporter bridges across the Mersey at Warrington. The first was erected in 1905 slightly to the north of the existing bridge and was later transformed into a pipeline bridge, before it was demolished.

It is one of three remaining such bridges in the UK.

Regeneration

The bridge is recorded in the National Heritage List for England as a designated Grade II* listed building, and because of its poor condition it is on the Heritage at Risk Register.  The bridge is protected as a Scheduled Ancient Monument.

A local group called Friends of Warrington Transporter Bridge (FoWTB) was formed in April 2015 to act as the independent voice of the bridge. The group is liaising with other interest groups to safeguard the future of the bridge and its industrial heritage status. FoWTB has been featured on the local BBC News programme, North West Tonight and has set up a website for the bridge along with Facebook and Twitter pages. In 2016, the bridge was nominated for the Institution of Civil Engineers North West Heritage Award.

See also 
Grade I and II* listed buildings in Warrington
List of Scheduled Monuments in Cheshire (post-1539)

References 

Bibliography

 Rennison, R.W., "Civil Engineering Heritage : Northern England", Thomas Telford Publishing, 2nd edn., 1996, 
 Thompson, Dave, "Bridging the Years", MailBook Publishing, 2000

External links 
 Official website

 Picture on geograph
 "Bank Quay transporter bridge, Warrington – Warrington (UA)", English Heritage, Heritage at Risk Register
 

Transporter bridges
Bridges completed in 1915
Bridges in Cheshire
Grade II* listed buildings in Cheshire
Grade II* listed bridges in England
Scheduled monuments in Cheshire
River Mersey
Buildings and structures in Warrington
Bridges across the River Mersey